Lost (T)apes is a compilation album by Guano Apes of previously unreleased demos, originally recorded in 1994 and 1995.

Half the demos were later re-recorded for all three Guano Apes albums, whilst 6 were left completely unreleased until this album.

A deluxe edition, titled The Best & The Lost (T)apes also exists.  Disc One is simply the standard edition of the Planet of the Apes compilation, and Disc Two is the Lost (T)apes album.

Track listing

References

2006 albums
Guano Apes albums
GUN Records compilation albums